Apinayé or Apinajé may refer to:
 Apinayé people, an ethnic group of Brazil
 Apinayé language, a language of Brazil

Language and nationality disambiguation pages